A riverboat casino is a type of casino on a riverboat found in several states in the United States with frontage on the Mississippi River and its tributaries, or along the Gulf Coast. Several states authorized this type of casino in order to enable gambling but limit the areas where casinos could be constructed; it was a type of legal fiction as the riverboats were seldom, if ever, taken away from the dock.

History
Paddlewheel riverboats had long been used on the Mississippi River and its tributaries to transport  passengers and freight. After railroads largely superseded them, in the 20th century, they were more frequently used for entertainment excursions, sometimes for several hours, than for passage among riverfront towns. They were often a way for people to escape the heat of the town, as well as to enjoy live music and dancing. Gambling was also common on the riverboats, in card games and via slot machines.

When riverboat casinos were first approved in the late 20th century by the states, which generally prohibited gaming on land, these casinos were required to be located on ships that could sail away from the dock. In some areas, gambling was allowed only when the ship was sailing, as in the traditional excursions. They were approved in states with frontage along the Mississippi and its tributaries, including Illinois, Indiana, Louisiana, Mississippi and Missouri. Illinois also allowed limited riverboat casinos in the Chicago metropolitan area, which has a Mississippi River connection through the Chicago Sanitary and Ship Canal, while Northwest Indiana has three 'riverboat' casinos in harbors along Lake Michigan.

An unusual situation occurred on the Potomac River in the mid-20th century due to a quirk in the state border between Maryland and Virginia. The border is not in the middle of the river, rather it is at the low water mark on the Virginia side such that the entire river is in Maryland (except for small portions in the District of Columbia.) As a result, there were several riverboat casinos docked off of the Virginia shoreline in the 1950s, when gambling was legal in parts of Maryland but not Virginia. As the river was in Maryland, visitors could park in Virginia, and walk across a pier, crossing the state line in the process. There was no law in Maryland against having casinos on land, but this spared Virginia residents the trouble of having to cross the river, which could involve driving a significant distance out of the way to the nearest bridge.

As an example, in 1994 Missouri voters approved amending the state constitution to allow "games of chance" on the Mississippi and Missouri rivers. By 1998, "according to the state Gaming Commission, just three of the 16 operations comprising Missouri's $652-million riverboat gambling industry [were] clearly on the main river channel." The state supreme court had ruled that boats had to be "solely over and in contact with the surface" of the rivers. Several casinos had been located on riverboats located in a moat or an area with water adjacent to a navigable waterway, leading them to be referred to as "boats in moats." The state legislatures were unwilling to give up the revenues generated by gambling. Over time, they allowed gaming casinos to be built on stilts, though with the requirement they had to be over navigable water.

Following Hurricane Katrina in 2005, which destroyed most riverboat casinos and their associated facilities of hotels, restaurants, etc., in states along the Gulf Coast, several states changed their enabling legislation or amended constitutions. They permitted such casinos to be built on land within certain geographic limits from a navigable waterway. Most of Mississippi's Gulf Coast riverboat casinos have been rebuilt on beachfronts with solid foundation systems since the hurricane.

References

External links
 Partial listing of permanently moored casinos, DeJong and Lebet, Inc., Naval Architects and Marine Designers

 
Casinos
Riverboats
Gambling ships